A list of a small subset of ancient Egyptian palettes, ranging in the Naqada periods, 4th millennium BC, probably mostly from ~3500 to 3000 BC; some palettes may be from the later period of the earliest 3rd millennium BC.

These cosmetic palettes come in numerous shapes and sizes, and were often found in tombs or graves. They were preceded by a period of palettes called rhomboidal palettes, unadorned, and without the cosmetic mixing circle found on some of the later Naqada period palettes.

Alphabetical individual listing, (abbreviated)

Battlefield Palette
"Two-bird headspalette (Brooklyn)"
"Bird palette (Louvre no XXX)"(bird-resting, on its feet)
Double-Bird Palette, ("Anchor Palette")
Bull Palette
El Ahaiwah Dog Palette
Four Dogs Palette, Giraffes Palette
Oxford PaletteMinor Hierakonpolis Dogs Palette
"Fish palette (Louvre dolphin type)"
New Kingdom: Fish-shaped palette-(Bulti-hieroglyph type); Adorned fish side/ with cosmetic side for daily use.

Gerzeh Palette
Barbary Goat Palette
Trussed-Goose Palette
Guinea Fowl Palette
Hunters Palette
"Ka Palette (no. 1)"
"Ka Palette (no. 2)"
Libyan Palette
Manshiyat Ezzat Palette
Min Antelope Palette
Min Palette
Narmer Palette
"Turtle palette (no. 1)"-(Louvre)(See zoomorphic palette)
Turtle Palette no. 2

List of ancient Egyptian Predynastic palettes

Shield-shape palettes
A list of shield-shaped palettes; the majority are vertically oriented. (The Hunters Palette is an example of a horizontally-oriented palette.)

Zoomorphic palettes
A list of zoomorphic, or animal style Egyptian palettes.

Bird palettes

Miscellaneous palettes, fragments

Egyptian hieroglyphs and the palette's corpus
A list of the Egyptian hieroglyphs and the individual palettes.

Gerzeh Palette
The Gerzeh Palette, or "Hathor Palette", "Cow-Head Palette" has topics containing 5-stars, a pair of horns, and a stylized "head". The hieroglyphs are: N14, F13, and possibly a relation to Y8, Hathor-sistrum, (the shape of the cow's head, as on the Narmer Palette), and R20.

Min Palette
The only adornment is a "typographic ligature" style combination of the archaic "Min symbol"--R23 with the hieroglyph for "crook-staff"--S39(1/4 of palette face).

Galleries

Zoomorphic gallery

Miscellaneous pallettes

See also
Cosmetic palette
Zoomorphic palette
Gardiner's Sign List

References

Schulz, Regine; Seidel, Matthias eds.;  Egypt, The World of the Pharaohs,  (w/ 34 contributing Authors), Konemann, Germany, c 1998, (538 pp), (hardcover).

External links

 Corpus of Egyptian Late Predynastic Palettes by Francesco Raffaele

Palettes